Qiu Xueqiang (born August 1957) is a Chinese prosecutor and politician. He was a representative of the 16th, 17th, and 19th National Congress of the Chinese Communist Party. He was an alternate member of the 16th Central Committee of the Chinese Communist Party. He was a member of the Standing Committee of the 17th and 18th Central Commission for Discipline Inspection. He is a member of the 19th Central Committee of the Chinese Communist Party.  He is a member of the 13th National Committee of the Chinese People's Political Consultative Conference.

Biography
Qiu was born in Shen County, Shandong, in August 1957. In July 1975, he became a secretary for the CCP Yushu Tibetan Autonomous Prefecture Committee. He joined the People's Procuratorate of Yushu Tibetan Autonomous Prefecture in November 1978 and rose to become its deputy chief procurator in June 1986. He joined the Chinese Communist Party (CCP) in December 1980. In October 1987, he was made deputy director of the Office of Combating Economic Crimes of the CCP Qinghai Provincial Committee, he remained in that position until January 1989, when he was assigned to the Qinghai Provincial People's Procuratorate. In July 1991, he became secretary-general of the Political and Legal Commission of CCP Qinghai Provincial Committee, but having held the position for only two years.

He was transferred to the Supreme People's Procuratorate in December 1993, where he was promoted to director of the Political Department in February 2000 and to deputy chief procurator in June 2001. In May 2020, he took office as vice chairperson of the Social and Legal Affairs Committee of the Chinese People's Political Consultative Conference.

References

1957 births
Living people
People from Liaocheng
Central Party School of the Chinese Communist Party alumni
People's Republic of China politicians from Shandong
Chinese Communist Party politicians from Shandong
Members of the 19th Central Committee of the Chinese Communist Party
Alternate members of the 16th Central Committee of the Chinese Communist Party
Members of the Standing Committee of the 13th Chinese People's Political Consultative Conference